Rafael Grovas Felix (November 29, 1905 in Santurce, Puerto Rico – September 9, 1991) was a Roman Catholic bishop.

Ordained to the priesthood in 1928, Grovas Felix was named bishop of the Roman Catholic Diocese of Caguas, Puerto Rico in 1965, and retired in 1981.

Episcopal succession

Notes

1905 births
1991 deaths
Bishops appointed by Pope Paul VI
People from Santurce, Puerto Rico
20th-century Roman Catholic bishops in Puerto Rico
Roman Catholic bishops of Puerto Rico
Roman Catholic bishops of Caguas